The 1987 NCAA Division I men's ice hockey tournament was the culmination of the 1986–87 NCAA Division I men's ice hockey season, the 40th such tournament in NCAA history. It was held between March 20 and 28, 1987, and concluded with North Dakota defeating Michigan State 5-3. All Quarterfinals matchups were held at home team venues while all succeeding games were played at the Joe Louis Arena in Detroit, Michigan.

Qualifying teams
The NCAA permitted 8 teams to qualify for the tournament and divided its qualifiers into two regions (East and West). Each of the tournament champions from the four Division I conferences (CCHA, ECAC, Hockey East and WCHA) received automatic invitations into the tournament with At-large bids making up the remaining 4 teams, 1 from each conference.

Format
The tournament featured three rounds of play. The two odd-number ranked teams from one region were placed into a bracket with the two even-number ranked teams of the other region. The teams were then seeded according to their ranking. In the Quarterfinals the first and fourth seeds and the second and third seeds played two-game aggregate series to determine which school advanced to the Semifinals. Beginning with the Semifinals all games were played at the Joe Louis Arena and all series became Single-game eliminations. The winning teams in the semifinals advanced to the National Championship Game with the losers playing in a Third Place game.

Tournament bracket

Note: * denotes overtime period(s)

Quarterfinals

(E1) Boston College vs. (W4) Minnesota

(E2) Harvard vs. (W3) Bowling Green

(W1) North Dakota vs. (E4) St. Lawrence

(W2) Michigan State vs. (E3) Maine

Semifinal

(W1) North Dakota vs. (E2) Harvard

(W2) Michigan State vs. (W4) Minnesota

Third-place game

(E2) Harvard vs. (W4) Minnesota

National Championship

(W1) North Dakota vs. (W2) Michigan State

All-Tournament team
G: Ed Belfour (North Dakota)
D: Ian Kidd (North Dakota)
D: Chris Luongo (Michigan State)
D: Don McSween (Michigan State)
F: Tony Hrkac* (North Dakota)
F: Bob Joyce (North Dakota)
F: Corey Millen (Minnesota)
* Most Outstanding Player(s)

References

Tournament
NCAA Division I men's ice hockey tournament
NCAA Division I Men's Ice Hockey Tournament
NCAA Division I Men's Ice Hockey Tournament
NCAA Division I Men's Ice Hockey Tournament
NCAA Division I Men's Ice Hockey Tournament
NCAA Division I Men's Ice Hockey Tournament
NCAA Division I Men's Ice Hockey Tournament
Ice hockey competitions in Boston
Ice hockey competitions in Detroit
Ice hockey competitions in Michigan
Ice hockey competitions in North Dakota
Sports in Grand Forks, North Dakota
East Lansing, Michigan